The 2015–16 Virginia Cavaliers women's basketball team will represent the University of Virginia during the 2015–16 college basketball season. The Cavaliers, led by fifth year head coach Joanne Boyle. The Cavaliers are members of the Atlantic Coast Conference and play their home games at the John Paul Jones Arena. They finished the season 17–16, 6–10 in ACC play to finish in a tie for ninth place. They lost in the second round of the ACC women's tournament to Duke. They were invited to the Women's National Invitation Tournament where they defeated VCU and Rutgers in the first and second rounds before losing to Hofstra in the third round.

2015–16 media

Virginia Cavaliers Sports Network
The Virginia Cavaliers Sports Network will broadcast select Cavaliers games on WINA. John Freeman, Larry Johnson, and Myron Ripley will provide the call for the games. Games not broadcast on WINA can be listened to online through Cavaliers Live at virginiasports.com.

Roster

Schedule

|-
!colspan=9 style="background:#00214E; color:#F56D22;"|Non-conference regular season

|-
!colspan=9 style="background:#00214E; color:#F56D22;"|Conference regular season

|-
!colspan=9 style="background:#00214E; color:#F56D22;"| ACC Women's tournament

|-
!colspan=9 style="background:#00214E; color:#F56D22;"| WNIT

Rankings

See also
 2015–16 Virginia Cavaliers men's basketball team

References

Virginia Cavaliers women's basketball seasons
Virginia
2016 Women's National Invitation Tournament participants